WhatsApp University is a pejorative term which refers to the fake news and misinformation spread in India through WhatsApp forwards. The term was coined by Indian journalist Ravish Kumar.

The phrase has gained a popular meme status and been a subject of stand-up comics.

Mentions

Politics

The pejorative is generally used by political dissenters to refer to the Bharatiya Janata Party and Modi government.

Courts
In May 2022, Kerala High Court dismissed a PIL, alleging forceful vaccination of children in schools based on social media rumours. It remarked, “Don't go by this WhatsApp University. You are here with a speculative cause of action. We are not going to create confusion in the minds of people.”

See also
 Indian WhatsApp lynchings

References 

Misinformation
Social media
WhatsApp
Popular culture neologisms